Carolina Slagter (30 April 1994) is a Dutch water polo player.

She was part of the Dutch team at the 2013 World Aquatics Championships.

References

Bekerfinale UZSC – ZVL (v)

External links

1994 births
Living people
Dutch female water polo players